The Wellington Region has a well developed public transport system, the most used in New Zealand. It consists of electric and diesel buses, commuter trains, ferries and a funicular (the Wellington Cable Car). It also included trams until 1964 and trolleybuses until 2017.

Buses and ferries are privately owned, with the infrastructure owned by public bodies, and public transport is often subsidised. The Greater Wellington Regional Council is responsible for planning and subsidising public transport, and pays around NZ$30 million for bus and train services each year. The services are marketed under the name Metlink. The system covers Wellington City, Lower Hutt, Upper Hutt, Porirua, the Kapiti Coast and the Wairarapa.

System

Extent
The Regional Council's Regional Public Transport Plan notes that  Wellington had in 2017:
 a rail network with 147 carriages serving 53 stations
 a bus network with approximately 470 buses serving around 2,800 stops on around 108 routes
 two harbour ferries
 a five-station funicular, the Cable Car.
GIS information indicates that 77% of the region's population lives within 800 metres of
public transport stop with a 30-minute frequency or better.

Wellington's hilly terrain has a considerable effect on public transport. Some planners consider Wellington to be a "good" city for public transport management, as the topography concentrates settlement in valleys or along coastlines, providing clear, dense "corridors" for transport routes. At the same time, however, the hilly terrain proved a hindrance for the construction of rail and tram lines, and buses sometimes have difficulty on narrow and winding streets.

Usage
According to Metlink, over 40 million passenger trips were made by public transport in Wellington in 2018/2019, and this number has been growing in recent years. The Wellington region has the highest per capita use of public transport in New Zealand, with  trips per capita in the year ending September 2019.

Of the approximately 37.33 million trips, around 24.33 million are made by bus, 12.80 million by train, and 0.18 million by ferry.

Patronage data from the 2018/19 year is not directly comparable with previous years, particularly for bus services, due to changes in the reporting method for statistics related to the implementation of new bus contracts in the region. Details may be found in the cited spreadsheet.

Ticketing 
Snapper cards to pay for fares instead of paper tickets were used on some buses from 2009; and on the Johnsonville Line from 2021, with adoption on other lines proposed.

Snapper cards have been in use on the Hutt Valley Line, Kapiti Line, the Melling Branch and the Wairarapa Connection from November 2022.

Modes

Buses

Wellington has an extensive network of bus routes. The routes are determined by the Regional Council, which regulates commercially provided services and solicits bids from private operators to run the services it is prepared to subsidise.

From July 2018, the largest operator is Tranzit Group, which provides services for most of Wellington City, the Hutt Valley, and the Wairarapa under the Tranzurban brand. In Porirua and the Kapiti Coast most services are provided by Uzabus. Other bus providers in the region include Mana Coach Services (owner of Newlands Coach Services) which provides services in the northern suburbs and Tawa, and NZ Bus which provides services from Eastbourne and the east-west spine between Karori and Miramar. Prior to July 2018, the largest operator was NZ Bus, which provided services for most of Wellington City under the GOWellington brand and for the Hutt Valley under the Valley Flyer and Runciman Motors brands. In Porirua and the Kapiti Coast most services were provided by Mana Coach Services.

The majority of buses in the Wellington area are powered by diesel, but GOWellington also had 60 trolleybuses that it operated within Wellington city. The trolleybus network was introduced between 1949 and 1964 to replace Wellington's trams (see below) and closed down in October 2017. From July 2018, Tranzit will introduce electric buses progressively onto their routes; the Greater Wellington Regional Council has also voted to look into proposals to make both rapid transport spines, Johnsonville to Island Bay and Karori to Seatoun, fully electric by 2021 and 2023 respectively and make a core route in both the Hutt Valley and Porirua fully electric as electric buses are introduced. As of July 2022 there are 80 electric buses in service. 20 With Tranzit, 9 With Mana, and 51 with NZ Bus. Since 2018, new diesel buses on Metlink routes are required to be at least Euro V standard.

All Metlink buses accept the contactless Snapper card. As of April 2011, Wellington buses report real time location information which is displayed on electronic signs in some Wellington bus stops and can be viewed online.

From 2019, bike racks have been fitted to most buses operated in Metlink branding.

Tawa has 5 on-demand minibuses operated by Mana for a year's trial from 16 May 2022.

Trains

Transdev Wellington operates Metlink's five-line  commuter network, which fans north out of Wellington railway station as far as Waikanae in the north and Masterton in the east. Transdev Wellington operates the service under contract to the Greater Wellington Regional Council with rolling stock (except for diesel locomotives used on the Wairarapa services) owned by the council, and rail infrastructure owned by KiwiRail. Until 2016 KiwiRail division Tranz Metro had the contract to operate Metlink's services.

On average, 930,000 trips are made on Metlink trains each month. In 2013-14, Tranz Metro claimed 94.3% punctuality, being the proportion of trains arriving within five minutes of schedule (94.7% punctuality if normalised for the effects of the 2013 Seddon earthquake and 2013 Lake Grassmere earthquake).

Since July 2016, Wellington's commuter rail services have been operated by Transdev Wellington. Transdev subcontracts KiwiRail to provide and operate the diesel locomotives on the Wairarapa services. In the year ending 30 June 2017, 88.3% of rail services ran on time; this figure is lower than previous years, as timeliness is now measured directly by Metlink rather than relying on self-reporting by the operator, and is measured at all key stations rather than just Wellington Station.

There are two major rail corridors in Wellington. The North Island Main Trunk (NIMT) runs along the western coastline, passing through Porirua and Paraparaumu to Waikanae on the Kapiti Coast (known as the Kapiti Line); the Wairarapa Line runs along the edge of Wellington Harbour and then up the Hutt Valley, passing through both Lower and Upper Hutt (known as the Hutt Valley Line). Less frequent services continue through the rural Wairarapa, stopping at a number of small towns before terminating at Masterton. There are also the Johnsonville Line in the north of Wellington and the Melling Line on the western side of Lower Hutt. The Kapiti Line and Hutt Valley Line are mostly double track, except for a short stretch on the Kapiti Line between Muri and Paekakariki and between the Waikanae River and Waikanae station. The Johnsonville line is single track with passing loops, while the Melling lines is single track throughout.

There are 49 stations in the rail network, all except Wellington railway station owned by Greater Wellington Regional Council. Wellington station is the busiest by far, with trains arriving and departing every few minutes at peak times. The next busiest stations are Porirua, Waterloo (in Lower Hutt) and Johnsonville. Most stations are served by only one line.

Most trains are the FP class Matangi electric multiple units, in sets of two to eight cars, introduced from 2011. They displaced the older DM class English Electric units, the last of which were withdrawn from service in 2012, and the EM class Ganz Mavag units, the last of which were withdrawn from service in 2016. The Wairarapa line beyond Upper Hutt is not electrified, so the Wairarapa Connection trains to Masterton are diesel-hauled with SW and SE class carriages.

There are long-distance trains to Palmerston North (the Capital Connection commuter train) and Auckland (the Northern Explorer). These are not part of the Wellington transport system.

History 
Electric suburban services began in July 1938, following the opening of the Tawa flat deviation of the North Island Main Trunk (NIMT). The Johnsonville Line, the former route of the NIMT out of the capital, was the first line to be electrified. By 1940 the NIMT (the present Kapiti Line) had been electrified as far north as Paekakariki.

The Hutt Valley Line was electrified to Taitā in 1953 to coincide with major state housing developments in the area. In 1954, the Wairarapa railway line was diverted between Petone and Haywards via Waterloo and Taitā, with the old line truncated to Melling to form the Melling Line. Electrification was extended to Upper Hutt in 1955.

Also in 1955, the 9 km Rimutaka Tunnel between Upper Hutt and Featherston opened, bypassing the laborious Rimutaka Incline and reducing the travel time from Wellington to Featherston to just over one hour, and from Wellington to Masterton to one-and-three-quarter hours. The Wairarapa Connection service started nine years later, after morning and afternoon peak services started to exceed the 176-seat capacity of the diesel railcars (twin NZR RM class) then used.

Electrification was extended to Paraparaumu in 1982, and to Waikanae in February 2011 to coincide with the arrival of the new Matangi electric multiple units.

Services

The Metlink network consists of five lines totalling . All lines originate from Wellington railway station, at the northern end of the Wellington central business district.
Around  of the network is electrified at 1600 V direct current with overhead lines. The only part not electrified is the Wairarapa Line beyond Upper Hutt; as a result Wairarapa Connection trains are diesel-hauled.

Until 2001, Tranz Metro also operated the Capital Connection service between Palmerston North and Wellington. On the sale of 50% of Tranz Scenic to directors of the West Coast Railway (subsequently repurchased by Toll) it was transferred to Tranz Scenic (now KiwiRail Scenic), where it remains.

The five Metlink lines, from west to east, are:-

Rolling stock

Metlink's rolling stock consists of electric multiple units and diesel locomotive-hauled carriages.
Electric locomotive-hauled trains were withdrawn in 1988 on the retirement of the EW class electric locomotives, displaced by the EM/ET class "Ganz Mavag" units introduced in 1982. DM/D class "English Electric" units have been withdrawn as they became uneconomical to operate. Several DM/D units were kept for peak services and the Johnsonville Line, where the loading gauge and braking capacity prevented the EM/ET units operating.

New carriages were introduced to the Capital Connection in 1998 and the Wairarapa Connection in 2007. They are ex-British Rail Mark 2 carriages, re-gauged and refurbished. They replaced NZR 56-foot carriages built between 1937 and 1943.

In July 2007, GWRC ordered 48 FP/FT "Matangi" units to increase capacity and replace the remainder of the 70-year-old DM/D units. The Johnsonville Line was upgraded in 2008 and 2009 to accommodate the Matangi units.

In 2008, several DM/D units were reintroduced on peak services as an interim measure until the Matangi units arrived. Six SE BR Mark 2 carriages were partially refurbished and introduced for express peak services, top-and-tailed by two refurbished EO class electric locomotives. The locomotives, built in 1968, were used in the Otira Tunnel until its de-electrification in 1997. An additional locomotive was refurbished for backup. Due to mechanical issues and the availability of new rolling stock, the EOs were withdrawn from service in 2011.

On 25 June 2012, the last DM/D units were withdrawn from service, just one week shy of 74 years since the first members of the class entered service. The SE carriages formerly used with the EO electric locomotives were fitted with toilets and reallocated to the Wairarapa Connection in July 2013 to ease rolling stock constraints.

In June 2013, GWRC decided to purchase 35 additional Matangi units instead of refurbishing the EM/ET units. The last EM/ET units were withdrawn on 27 May 2016 after 34 years in service.

KiwiRail provides four diesel-electric locomotives on a "hook-and-tow" basis to operate the Wairarapa Connection trains. Since July 2015, services have been hauled by the DFT class; before then, the DC class was primarily used.

Future
The 2013 Review and Draft 2014 Review of the Wellington Regional Public Transport Plan confirmed that building additional stations on the Kapiti Line at Raumati and Lindale was no longer recommended, with the cost of new stations outweighing the benefits. The detailed analysis for Raumati (which was a "viability benchmark" for other new stations) said that the modelled peak-hour patronage needed to be about 300 new passengers to justify a new station, and that most Raumati users would have switched from Paraparaumu Station. Network extensions beyond the current Metlink rail operation limits would be by "shuttles or non-electrified services" running to Wellington. This followed a campaign to extend electrified commuter services to Otaki, following the extension of the Kapiti Line to Waikanae in 2011.

Service improvements proposed in May 2017 are double-tracking the line between Trentham and Upper Hutt; a third-platform or passing loop at Porirua Station; and a "turnback" point at Plimmerton Station so that trains can continue in the opposite direction without using a turnaround point. These will ease peak-hour congestion and allow increased trains at busy times. However, they are regarded by KiwiRail as "service enhancements" rather than renewals/maintenance which KiwiRail would pay for, so the GWRC is seeking taxpayer funding towards the $30 million cost before inclusion in the 2017-18 Annual Plan as Rail Scenario 1. Immediate work required first is the replacement of some traction poles on the Hutt Line.

From July 2018, the Hutt Valley and Kapiti lines will run every twenty minutes off-peak on weekdays rather than half-hourly.

In 2019/20, the GWRC is to "renew" the Crofton Downs, Featherston, Silverstream, Wallaceville and Trentham (outer) railway stations.

The Greater Wellington Regional Council endorsed a Wellington Rail Programme Business case for a 30-year programme for  regional rail system which included  increased rail services as follows, but apparently depends on further government investment., and was to go to Waka Kotahi for endorsement; according to a statement of 1 July 2022: 
Train frequency will be able to progressively improve as infrastructure is improved. Peak train services on the Hutt and Kāpiti lines would be increased in 2025 to four trains per hour, along with improved longer distance services to Masterton and Palmerton North by 2028.  The peak service frequency is proposed to step up to six trains per hour (every 10 minutes) on the Hutt and Kāpiti lines by 2032, along with inter-peak services increasing to four trains per hour. The Kāpiti line is expected to further improve to 10 trains per hour during the peak by the mid 2030’s, and the Hutt Line by early 2040’s.

Replacement of diesel-hauled trains 
For several years the Greater Wellington Regional Council has put forward proposals to replace the diesel-hauled Capital Connection to Palmerston North and the Wairarapa Connection to Masterton with Dual or Bi-mode trains which would operate on overhead electric power to Waikanae and Upper Hutt respectively, and then on diesel or battery power.

In 2017 it was proposed to run additional Wairarapa trains and upgrade the Wairarapa Line. Funding for new electro-diesel multiple units were included in a $990 million funding bid to NZTA in 2018.

In 2019, the GWRC proposed replacing the Capital Connection and Wairarapa Connection trains with 15 four-car bi-mode multiple units by 2025. These trains are estimated to cost $415 million.

In May 2020, GWRC received $5m in funding from the NZTA to write a business case and commence procurement for replacement rolling stock on Wairarapa Line services and the "Manawatū Line." A fleet of 15 four-car Multiple Units is envisaged. However proposals to the government from 2019 to 2022  have not received funding.

In 2022 the GWRC was progressing a business case with the government for $3-$4 billion electric regional trains to tackle population growth.

Ferries

Only the western and northern shores of Wellington Harbour are heavily populated, and the trip between these population centres is often as quick along the coast as it is by water: demand for ferries has been lower than might otherwise be expected. Two ferry routes are operated by East by West, a private company: daily between central Wellington and Days Bay on the eastern coast, near Eastbourne, serving Seatoun at peak times from 3 April 2008; and the Harbour Explorer Excursion at weekends, also serving Seatoun. Off-peak and weekend sailings call at Matiu / Somes Island, a nature reserve.

Historically ferries also served Miramar, Karaka Bay, and Eastbourne proper. These routes were discontinued as road connections around the region improved. After the 2016 Kaikoura earthquake, weekend services to Petone temporarily ceased due to wharf damage.

There are also larger road and rail ferries that cross Cook Strait to Picton in the South Island. These are not part of Wellington's public transport system.

Cable Car

The Wellington Cable Car runs between the central city and the hill suburb of Kelburn. It is used by commuters travelling to and from work, by people travelling from the city to the Wellington Botanic Garden, and by students at Victoria University.

Despite its name, it is a funicular with two counterbalanced cars permanently attached to each other by a cable, rather than a true cable car, where the cars grip or release the cable as needed. The cable runs through a pulley at the top of the hill, driven by an electric motor. Originally the cable car was a hybrid between a true cable car and a funicular, but retained its name when it was converted to a full funicular.

It is owned and operated by Wellington Cable Car Ltd, a wholly owned subsidiary of Wellington City Council. Until 2007 it was operated under contract by Transfield Services, a private company. Unlike most other public transport in Wellington, it runs without subsidy.

Trams (historic)

Between 1878 and 1964, Wellington had trams serving the western, eastern and southern suburbs, with the northern suburbs served by trains. The trams were replaced by buses or trolleybuses, although occasional calls are made for light rail to be reintroduced.

Light rail

Following the 2010 mayoral elections, Mayor Celia Wade-Brown pledged to investigate light rail between Wellington station and the airport. Mayor Justin Lester reaffirmed his support for light rail along the golden mile in 2018.

Notes

References

Further reading

External links

Metlink website